Force 10 from Navarone is a 1978 war film loosely based on Alistair MacLean's 1968 novel of the same name. It is a sequel to the 1961 film The Guns of Navarone. The parts of Mallory and Miller are played by Robert Shaw (who died before the film was released), and Edward Fox, succeeding in the roles originally portrayed by Gregory Peck and David Niven. It was directed by Guy Hamilton and also stars Harrison Ford, Carl Weathers, Barbara Bach, Franco Nero (in a "plastic surgery" role previously played by Tutte Lemkow), and Richard Kiel.

The film gets its title from the Alistair MacLean book of the same name, but bears so little resemblance to the novel that MacLean loosely adapted part of the screenplay into his 1982 book Partisans.

Plot
In 1943, Major Keith Mallory and Sergeant Donovan "Dusty" Miller from British Commandos are sent to find and eliminate Nicolai, a German spy who previously betrayed the Navarone mission to the Germans and is now believed to have successfully infiltrated the Yugoslav Partisans as "Captain Lescovar". To get to Yugoslavia, the two men pair with "Force 10", an American sabotage unit led by US Army Rangers Lieutenant Colonel Mike Barnsby and steal a bomber. They are joined by Weaver, a Medical Corps sergeant arrested by the Military Police, and escape, only to be shot down by the Luftwaffe. Only Barnsby, Mallory, Miller, Weaver, and Lieutenant Doug Reynolds (Angus MacInnes) escape the crippled plane.

The survivors come upon a band of men they believe to be partisans but are later revealed as collaborationist Chetniks led by Captain Drazak. Taken prisoner, they tell the German commander in control of the area, Major Schroeder, that they are deserters. To keep Schroeder from opening Miller's explosives suitcase, Mallory claims it contains the new drug "penicillin" which will spoil if exposed. The next morning the prisoners are told that Schroeder has opened the case, finding it full of firewood. They improvise an excuse, "admitting" they buried the samples. Schroeder sends Barnsby and Mallory to retrieve them under the guard of his concubine Maritza and three soldiers. Miller, Weaver, and Reynolds are left in camp.

Far from camp, Maritza kills the Germans, revealing herself to be a partisan and the person who hid the explosives. She directs Mallory and Barnsby towards the partisan camp under the command of her father, Major Petrovich. Mallory and Barnsby escape and meet a patrol of real Yugoslav partisans led by Lescovar, who has gained Petrovich's trust. Mallory and Barnsby are taken to the camp, which lies near a hydroelectric dam. An arch bridge spanning the river ravine is set to be used by a German force for an impending assault on the partisans, who have been unable to destroy the bridge. Barnsby reveals that the bridge is Force 10's target.

Mallory convinces Petrovich to mount a rescue mission of demolitions expert Miller, using Lescovar and Marko, a loyal partisan. The four re-enter the camp at night, with Mallory and Barnsby posing as captives, and Lescovar and Marko disguised as Chetniks. Drazak discovers that Maritza must have helped Miller and Mallory escape, and begins beating her viciously. Schroeder and Reynolds are killed in a gun battle, but the others escape with a badly beaten Maritza and the recovered explosives.

Miller reveals that the bridge is impregnable, which Barnsby refuses to accept. Mallory hits upon the idea of destroying the upstream dam, to use the sudden onrush of millions of gallons of water to destroy the bridge. A night-time air drop is arranged to replace Force 10's lost supplies, but Lescovar, revealed to be the saboteur, calls in German planes to stop the drop. Maritza catches Lescovar in the act, but he kills her before she can warn the others, and German planes bomb the illuminated drop zone, killing numerous partisans.

Petrovich, angered by the botched air drop, orders the men to be sent to Marshal Tito's headquarters for transport back to Italy. Accompanied by Lescovar and Marko, the team instead infiltrates the German marshaling yards at Mostar to steal explosives. Lescovar again betrays them, alerting a German sergeant to their presence. Marko sacrifices himself to save the others, who escape with Lescovar aboard a train leaving for Sarajevo. Lescovar is questioned by the others, who have grown suspicious of him. Lescovar initially denies the accusations, but gives himself away and is shot dead by Barnsby, who then asks Mallory to return the favour by helping him accomplish Force 10's mission.

Jumping the train near the dam, the team splits up: Miller and Weaver run a diversion, while Mallory and Barnsby sneak into the dam. Weaver runs into Captain Drazak and kills him in a knife fight. Mallory and Barnsby set their charges within the dam; its structural integrity compromised by the blast, the dam wall bursts, releasing a torrent of water that topples the bridge. The German assault is thwarted, saving Petrovich and the partisans.

Mallory and Barnsby rejoin Miller and Weaver, but Mallory reminds the others they are trapped on the wrong side of the river. As the credits roll, the men begin a strenuous journey back to friendly lines.

Cast
 Robert Shaw as Major Keith Mallory
 Harrison Ford as Lieutenant Colonel Mike Barnsby
 Edward Fox as Staff Sergeant John Miller
 Barbara Bach as Maritza Petrović
 Franco Nero as Captain Lescovar / Colonel Von Ingorslebon, a German Abwehr intelligence officer
 Carl Weathers as Sergeant Olen Weaver
 Richard Kiel as Captain Dražak
 Alan Badel as Major Petrović
 Michael Byrne as Major Schroeder
 Philip Latham as Commander Jensen
 Angus MacInnes as Lieutenant Doug Reynolds
 Michael Sheard as Sergeant Bauer
 Petar Buntic as Marko
 Paul Humpoletz as Sergeant Bismark
 Ramiz Pasic as Mallory's Boy

Production

Initial Development
Initially there had been plans to produce the film shortly after the 1961 original with Gregory Peck and David Niven reprising their roles. Following the success of the original film, producer Carl Foreman asked MacLean to write a hardcover sequel novel on which a follow-up film would be based, but the author was reluctant to write an entire novel and instead delivered a screen treatment.

In April 1967 Carl Foreman announced he would make After Navarone with Anthony Quinn, Gregory Peck and David Niven reprising their roles and J Lee Thompson returning as director. The film would be made by Columbia. In May 1967 it was announced the film would be called The High Dam and filming would take place in 1969.

Filming did not proceed. MacLean decided to develop the screen treatment as a book and Force 10 from Navarone was published in 1968.  The novel became a best seller.

Throughout the 1970s Foreman tried to get financial backing for the film. In December 1972 MacLean said Foreman's plan was to use the original cast and commented "they'll look a bit old for the war now."

Financing
In September 1976 it was announced Foreman, Oliver Unger and the German finance company, Mondo Films, had acquired the screen rights to the novel and screenplay Force 10 from Navarone. Foreman wrote the treatment and served as executive producer, but Unger wound up producing.

The producers wanted Robert Bolt to write the screenplay but he was busy working with David Lean. Bolt's agent Peggy Ramsey suggested they hire Robin Chapman.

In August 1977, the production company set up to make the movie, Navarone Productions, signed an agreement with AIP for the latter to distribute the film. AIP provided $2.1 million of the budget.

The film was originally budgeted at $8,312,224. AIP provided $2,104,942.93 to Navarone Productions and subsequently spent an additional $97,109.15 to produce a U.S. version of the film. Columbia Pictures advanced $2,900,000 and agreed to pay $1,100,000 more after delivery of the film in return for the exclusive and perpetual distribution rights in all territories outside the United States and Canada. A German investment group contributed $1 million, a Yugoslavian production company lent or provided services equal to $2 million; and American Broadcasting Company paid $1,800,000 for the right to broadcast the motion picture 3 times on network television.

Cinematographer Christopher Challis recalled that the film was originally considered to be filmed in Pakistan until someone realised that Pakistanis did not resemble Yugoslavians or Germans and the expense to make them appear as such on film would be financially prohibitive.

Casting
By the time film was to start, 17 years after the original, Peck and Niven were considered too old and the decision was made to recast.

By October 1977 the main cast had been settled: Robert Shaw, Edward Fox, Harrison Ford, Franco Nero, Barbara Bach. Shaw said "I find it a bit ridiculous at my age to be running around a mountain in Yugoslavia saying 'Let's go'."

It was Ford's first movie after the release of Star Wars. He says he picked the part because it was a "strong supporting character" that was "very different from Han Solo. I wanted to avoid being stereotyped as a science fiction type." Ford later said he did the film "to take advantage of the chance to work. And it was a job I did for the money."

Fox at the time was best known for The Day of the Jackal and playing Edward VIII on television. Caroline Munro said she was offered the female lead but she turned it down because it involved too much nudity.

MacLean was reportedly unhappy with the prominence given to the Barbara Bach character. "She's of minimal importance in my novel," he said.

Filming
Filming went for five months starting in late 1977. Shepperton Studios outside London were used for most indoor scenes and included a full-scale mock-up of a Lancaster bomber, while scenes were shot around the Đurđevića Tara Bridge, Montenegro,  and Jablanica Dam on Jablaničko Lake in Jablanica, Bosnia and Herzegovina with the assistance of Jadran Film. Scale models of the dam, the valley and the bridge were constructed at the Mediterranean Film Studios in Malta.

President Tito of Yugoslavia authorised his government to assist the production, including providing 2,000 soldiers as extras as well as uniforms and equipment and several Yugoslavian army T-34 tanks. He visited the set.

Some scenes were also shot in the Royal Naval Dockyard (South Yard) in Devonport, Plymouth. During a shot of the railway carriages the letters PSTO(N) can be seen, this stands for Principal Supply and Transport Officer (Navy), and on Jersey in the Channel Islands.

George MacDonald Fraser was hired to do further work on the script during filming in Yugoslavia, in part because he and Guy Hamilton got along well when both worked on Superman (1978). However Fraser is not credited on the film.

Edward Fox said five people worked on the script. "The action had been laid down but the characters were still stick figures. We had to dress them up and make the lines fit them as we went along."

Ford said during filming, "I was lost because I didn't know what the story was about. I didn't have anything to act. There was no reason for my character being there. I had no part of the story that was important to tell. I had a hard time taking the stage with the bull that I was supposed to be doing."

The bridge over the Tara River, which is the target of the commando operation in the film, was destroyed by partisans in 1942 with the original engineer that built the bridge (Lazar Jauković) involved in the operation to destroy it.

Shaw said during filming that "I'm seriously thinking that this might be my last film... I no longer have anything real to say. I'm appalled at some of the lines... I'm not at ease in film. I can't remember the last film I enjoyed making." Shaw's words proved prophetic as he died in August 1978 of a heart attack, before Navarone was released. It was his penultimate film, as he was filming Avalanche Express when he died.

Filming went over budget to more than $10 million and the completion guarantor had to step in and provide additional funds.

Musical score
Composer Ron Goodwin scored the film to the 126-minute version during the summer of 1978. Before the film was released it was shortened to 118 minutes. Additional music cues were created by recycling music from other parts of the film — typically reusing suspense passages in scenes for which they were not written. The CD release of the soundtrack by Film Score Monthly chronicles these changes, and presents the score as Goodwin wrote and recorded it for the 126-minute version.

Release
After being screened at Camp David as the Thanksgiving film for US President Jimmy Carter, the film was released in the United States on 8 December 1978 to mixed reviews (according to production notes that accompanied the 2000 DVD release).

Before the film came out Maclean said in an interview that the only film he liked made from his writings was Guns of Navarone and "I am hopeful this return to Navarone will be good too, although the storyline bears little resemblance to what I wrote. Robert Shaw was a good actor, one of the most in demand in the world today. And I am told he did a good job. Whatever, this couldn't help be the best [of the recent adaptations of his work for the screen] because the rest were rubbish. But I am not bitter, you understand. The sale of my stories to the movies has been a matter of business - a process from which I usually detach myself."

The 118-minute cut was released theatrically overseas by Columbia Pictures, which had released The Guns of Navarone.

Reception
Review aggregations website Rotten Tomatoes gives it a score of 63% based on 19 reviews.

Harrison Ford said "It wasn't a bad film. There were honest people involved and it was an honest effort. But it wasn't the right thing for me to do."

Box office
The film made a quarter of what the original did at the box office.

Legal action
Although three producers of the film are deceased (Carl Foreman, Sidney Cohn and Oliver Unger), their estates and surviving producer Peter Gettinger sued Sony Pictures (as Columbia Pictures' successor) for unpaid sums from distribution rights. Following a May 2008 trial in the New York Supreme Court, a judgement awarded the producers more than 30 years of funds withheld by Columbia Pictures. Sony appealed, but the Appellate Division of the Supreme Court upheld the initial verdict on 1 September 2009.

References

External links

 
 
 
 Movie review at AlistairMacLean.com

1970s action films
1970s adventure films
1970s war films
1978 films
American International Pictures films
American sequel films
British adventure films
British sequel films
British war films
Columbia Pictures films
Films scored by Ron Goodwin
Films based on British novels
Films based on military novels
Films based on works by Alistair MacLean
Films directed by Guy Hamilton
Films set in 1943
Films shot in Bosnia and Herzegovina
Films shot in Montenegro
Films shot in Yugoslavia
Films with screenplays by George MacDonald Fraser
War adventure films
War films set in Partisan Yugoslavia
World War II films based on actual events
American World War II films
British World War II films
Films shot in Jersey
Films shot in Malta
Films shot in Devon
Films shot at Shepperton Studios
1970s English-language films
1970s American films
1970s British films